The Oregon State Beavers men's soccer team is an intercollegiate varsity sports team of Oregon State University and competes in the Pac-12 Conference of the National Collegiate Athletic Association. The team was founded in 1988 and has competed in 26 college soccer seasons since that time.  The Beavers qualified for the NCAA tournament on six occasions, making their deepest run in the tournament in 2021 where they reached the quarterfinals.  The team has produced one Hermann Trophy winner, five NSCAA All-Americans and has had five players play for their respective national teams at the senior level.  The team's all-time match record is 254-275-76 as of the end of the 2019 season.

It was announced on December 28, 2017, that Native Oregonian Terry Boss would be returning to Oregon State as the Men's Soccer Head Coach.  Boss was the lead assistant coach for the 2013 season.  He has coached the Beavers to one conference championship and three NCAA tournament appearances.

MAC Hermann Trophy winners
Oregon State is associated with one player who was awarded the Hermann Trophy as the best collegiate player in the country.
 2020 - Gloire Amanda

NSCAA All-Americans
Oregon State is affiliated with three NSCAA All-Americans.
 2009 - Danny Mwanga (second team)
 2014 - Khiry Shelton (second team)
 2020 - Gloire Amanda (first team)
 2021 - Sofiane Djeffal (first team), Tyrone Mondi (third team)

Players receiving national caps
Oregon State is associated with five players who have represented their home nation at the senior level.

References 

https://osubeavers.com/services/download_file.ashx?file_location=https://s3.amazonaws.com/sidearm.sites/oregonstate.sidearmsports.com/documents/2019/9/19/2019_Quick_Facts.pdf

External links 
 

 
1988 establishments in Oregon
Association football clubs established in 1988